Breezin' Along is an LP album by The Four Lads released by Columbia Records as catalog number CL 1223 (monaural) and CS 8035 (stereo) in 1958, containing mostly popular standard songs. The Four Lads were backed by Ray Ellis' orchestra.

Track listing

The collection of mostly standards was similar to the Four Lads' earlier album, On the Sunny Side of the Street, (1956), and the two were combined in a compact disc released by Collectables Records on January 16, 2001.

The Four Lads albums
1958 albums
Columbia Records albums